The King Faisal Air Academy is a military officer academy and flight school in Riyadh, Saudi Arabia founded on 10 January 1968.

History

Founded on 10 January 1968,  by Prince Sultan bin Abdul Aziz, Minister of Defense and Aviation, King Faisal Air Academy was officially opened on 20 May 1970 under the auspices of King Faisal bin Abdul Aziz.

The college has an internal and external scholarship system to study other aviation sciences such as aviation engineering, accounting and law.

Present
Training lasts for twenty-seven months, with  bachelor's degrees in aeronautical sciences awarded to aircrew and engineering degrees awarded to technical specialties.

Programs include fighter pilot, weapon director, air traffic controller, and information technology training. Because most of the Royal Saudi Air Force's equipment is made by the United Kingdom and the United States, instruction is in English, and much of the faculty is British. Unlike other officer training schools, graduates of KFAA are trained as both pilots and officers  simultaneously and are fully qualified for both flight and command duties upon graduation. Some graduates go on to further training with the United States Air Force at Columbus Air Force Base.

References

Flight training
Education in Saudi Arabia
K